The Comoros fody (Foudia eminentissima), also known as the red-headed fody, is a species of passerine bird in the family Ploceidae. It is found in the Comoros. The taxon aldabrana, was previously often considered a subspecies of the Comoros fody. Previously, the forest fody from Madagascar was considered a subspecies of the Comoros fody.

References

External links

Aldabra fody and Comoros fody on Weaver Watch
Red-headed fody media on the Internet Bird Collection

Comoros fody
Birds of the Comoros
Birds of Mayotte
Birds of Seychelles
Comoros fody
Comoros fody
Taxonomy articles created by Polbot